Trinity County is a county located in the U.S. state of Texas.  As of the 2020 census, the population was 13,602. Its county seat is Groveton. The county is named for the Trinity River.

Trinity County is included in the Huntsville, TX Micropolitan Statistical Area, which is also included in the Houston-The Woodlands, TX Combined Statistical Area.

Geography

Adjacent counties
 Angelina County (northeast)
 Polk County (southeast)
 San Jacinto County (south)
 Walker County (southwest)
 Houston County (northwest)

National protected area
 Davy Crockett National Forest (part)

Demographics

Note: the US Census treats Hispanic/Latino as an ethnic category. This table excludes Latinos from the racial categories and assigns them to a separate category. Hispanics/Latinos can be of any race.

As of the census of 2000, there were 13,779 people, 5,723 households, and 4,000 families residing in the county.  The population density was 20 people per square mile (8/km2).  There were 8,141 housing units at an average density of 12 per square mile (5/km2).  The racial makeup of the county was 83.75% White, 11.92% Black or African American, 0.41% Native American, 0.23% Asian, 0.01% Pacific Islander, 2.66% from other races, and 1.01% from two or more races.  4.85% of the population were Hispanic or Latino of any race.

There were 5,723 households, out of which 25.70% had children under the age of 18 living with them, 55.10% were married couples living together, 11.20% had a female householder with no husband present, and 30.10% were non-families. 26.80% of all households were made up of individuals, and 14.60% had someone living alone who was 65 years of age or older.  The average household size was 2.38 and the average family size was 2.85.

In the county, the population was spread out, with 22.90% under the age of 18, 7.00% from 18 to 24, 22.30% from 25 to 44, 25.80% from 45 to 64, and 22.00% who were 65 years of age or older.  The median age was 43 years. For every 100 females there were 93.60 males.  For every 100 females age 18 and over, there were 90.70 males.

The median income for a household in the county was $27,070, and the median income for a family was $32,304. Males had a median income of $27,518 versus $21,696 for females. The per capita income for the county was $15,472.  About 13.20% of families and 17.60% of the population were below the poverty line, including 23.80% of those under age 18 and 13.90% of those age 65 or over.

Education
The following school districts serve Trinity County:
 Apple Springs Independent School District
 Groveton Independent School District
 Trinity Independent School District
 Centerville Independent School District

A small portion of Kennard ISD, located in neighboring Houston County, goes into Trinity County.

The county is in the service area of Angelina College.

Transportation

Major highways
  U.S. Highway 287
  State Highway 19
  State Highway 94

Railroads
Union Pacific operates a freight line running north–south through Trinity County.

Communities

Cities
 Groveton (county seat)
 Trinity

Census-designated place
 Westwood Shores

Unincorporated communities

 Apple Springs
 Barnes Switch
 Brush Prairie
 Carlisle
 Centerville
 Centralia
 Chita
 Crete
 Friday
 Helmic
 Josserand
 Lacy
 Nigton
 Nogalus Prairie
 Pennington (partly in Houston County)
 Red Branch
 Sebastopol
 South Groveton
 Sulphur
 Thompson
 Trevat
 Vair
 Woodlake

Ghost towns
 Friendship
 Saron
 Sumpter

Politics

See also
 National Register of Historic Places listings in Trinity County, Texas
 Recorded Texas Historic Landmarks in Trinity County

References

External links

 Trinity County government's website
 
 Groveton Times & Trinity Standard
 A History Of Trinity County 1827-1928 by Flora Gatlin Bowles
 Cadastral Map of Trinity County 1857 by John Baumgarthen
 Cadastral Map of Trinity County 1882 by V Schmidt

 
1850 establishments in Texas
Populated places established in 1850